The 2022–23 LEN Champions League was the 60th edition of LEN's premier competition for men's water polo clubs.

Qualified teams
The full list of teams qualified for each stage of the 2022–23 EHF European League was announced on 12 July 2022.

Schedule
The schedule of the competition is as follows.

Qualifying rounds

Qualification round I
The draw took place in Split. The top two ranked sides will advance from both groups.

Group A
23–26 September 2022, Nijverdal, Netherlands.

See also
2022–23 LEN Euro Cup
2022–23 LEN Challenger Cup

References

External links
, len.microplustiming.com

 
LEN Champions League seasons
2022 in water polo
2023 in water polo
LEN Champions League
LEN Champions League
LEN